Venezuela competed at the 1980 Summer Olympics in Moscow, USSR. 37 competitors, all men, took part in 20 events in 7 sports.

Medalists

Silver
Bernardo Piñango — Boxing, Men's Bantamweight (– 54 kg)

Athletics

Men's 800 metres
William Wuycke
 Heat — 1:48.5
 Semifinals — 1:47.4 (→ did not advance)

Boxing

Men's Light Flyweight (– 48 kg)
Pedro Manuel Nieves
 First Round — Defeated Singkham Phongprathith (Laos) after referee stopped contest in first round
 Second Round — Lost to Dietmar Geilich (East Germany) on points (0-5)

Men's Flyweight (– 51 kg)
Ramon Armando Guevara
 First Round — Defeated Nyama Narantuya (Mongolia) on points (5-0)
 Second Round — Lost to Yo Ryon-Sik (North Korea) on points (1-4)

Men's Bantamweight (– 54 kg)
Bernardo Piñango →  Silver Medal
 First Round — Bye
 Second Round — Defeated Ernesto Alguera (Nicaragua) on points (4-1)
 Third Round — Defeated Veli Koota (Finland) after diskwalification in second round
 Quarter Finals — Defeated John Siryakibbe (Uganda) after knock-out in second round
 Semi Finals — Defeated Dumitru Cipere (Romania) on points (3-2)
 Final — Lost to Juan Hernández (Cuba) on points (0-5)

Men's Featherweight (– 57 kg)
Antonio Esparragoza
 First Round — Bye
 Second Round — Lost to Peter Joseph Hanlon (Great Britain) on points (1-4)

Men's Lightweight (– 60 kg)
Nelson René Trujillo
 First Round — Lost to Sean Doyle (Ireland) after referee stopped contest in second round

Men's Light-Welterweight (– 63,5 kg)
Nelson José Rodriguez
 First Round — Lost to John Munduga (Uganda) on points (1-4)

Cycling

Five cyclists represented Venezuela in 1980.

Individual road race
 Jesús Torres
 Mario Medina
 Olinto Silva
 Juan Arroyo

Team time trial
 Claudio Pérez
 Olinto Silva
 Juan Arroyo
 Mario Medina

Football

Men's Team Competition
Preliminary Round (Group A)
 Lost to Soviet Union (0-4)
 Lost to Cuba (1-2)
 Defeated Zambia (2-1)
Quarter Finals
 Did not advance

Team Roster
 Eustorgio Sánchez
 Ordan Aguirre
 Emilio Campos
 Pedro Acosta
 Mauro Cichero
 Robert Elie
 Alexis Peña
 Asdrubal José Sanchez
 Iker Joseba Zubizarreta
 Bernardo Añor
 Angel Castillo
 César Armando Semidey
 Rodolfo Carvajal
 Pedro Juan Febles
 Nelson José Carrero
 Juan José Vidal

Shooting

Swimming

Men's 100m Freestyle
Alberto Eugenio Mestre
 Heats — 52,62 (→ did not advance)

Men's 200m Freestyle
Jean Marc Francois Carezis
 Heats — 1.54,76 (→ did not advance)
Rafael Vidal
 Heats — DNS

Weightlifting

References

External links
Official Olympic Reports
International Olympic Committee results database

Nations at the 1980 Summer Olympics
1980 Summer Olympics
1980 in Venezuelan sport